"" (The Flemish Lion) is the official anthem of Flanders, a region and community in Belgium.

Composition 

The words of this anthem were written in July 1847 by Hippoliet Van Peene (1811–1864) who was clearly inspired by the song Sie sollen ihn nicht haben, / den freien Deutschen Rhein, / So lang sich Herzen laben / An seinem Feuerwein (They must never get our free German Rhine, As long as hearts relish its fiery wine) by the German author Nikolaus Becker.

The music, by Karel Miry (1823–1899), is apparently influenced by Robert Schumann's Sonntags am Rhein.

Like France's Marseillaise, De Vlaamse Leeuw is a nationalist battle song. Franco-Belgian political tension in the mid-19th century made the Flemish public mood ripe for such an expression of regional feeling. At the time, it was not meant as anti-Belgian (as it often came to be seen by Flemish separatists and their Belgicist opponents), for the "enemy" it refers to is Belgium's southwestern neighbour France, as in the 1302 Battle of the Golden Spurs.

Around 1900, the anthem was in general use among Flemish militants.

On 6 July 1973, a decree by the then  (the precursor of the present Flemish Parliament) proclaimed the first two stanzas to be the official national anthem of Flanders. The text and musical notation were officially published on 11 July 1985.

Lyrics
Only the first two stanzas and their refrains are performed.

See also 
 De Leeuw van Vlaanderen (The Lion of Flanders, synonymous title, but also the nickname of its hero, the medieval Count Robert III of Flanders and the title of the Flemish national epic by Hendrik Conscience).
 Flag of Flanders, featuring a lion
 La Brabançonne
 Le Chant des Wallons

References

External links
 The Regional Government of Flanders has a page with information on the anthem, including a vocal recording (Dutch)

Belgian anthems
Dutch-language Belgian songs
Regional songs
1847 in Belgium
1847 songs
National anthem compositions in G major
Songs about military officers